Glen Alpine is a town in Burke County, North Carolina, United States. The population was 1,517 at the 2010 census. It is part of the Hickory–Lenoir–Morganton Metropolitan Statistical Area.

Geography
Glen Alpine is located in western Burke County at  (35.727721, -81.782327). It is bordered to the southeast by an extension of the city of Morganton. U.S. Route 70 passes through the town as Main Street, and Interstate 40 passes to the south of the town, with access from exits 98 and 100.

Demographics

2020 census

As of the 2020 United States census, there were 1,529 people, 635 households, and 481 families residing in the town.

2000 census
As of the census of 2000, there were 1,090 people, 423 households, and 307 families residing in the town. The population density was 588.0 people per square mile (227.5/km2). There were 443 housing units at an average density of 239.0 per square mile (92.5/km2). The racial makeup of the town was 81.28% White, 3.85% African American, 0.37% Native American, 13.49% Asian, 0.64% from other races, and 0.37% from two or more races. Hispanic or Latino of any race were 0.73% of the population.

There were 423 households, out of which 29.3% had children under the age of 18 living with them, 58.6% were married couples living together, 9.2% had a female householder with no husband present, and 27.2% were non-families. 24.1% of all households were made up of individuals, and 11.3% had someone living alone who was 65 years of age or older. The average household size was 2.57 and the average family size was 3.05.

In the town, the population was spread out, with 25.4% under the age of 18, 7.9% from 18 to 24, 23.9% from 25 to 44, 27.1% from 45 to 64, and 15.7% who were 65 years of age or older. The median age was 39 years. For every 100 females, there were 95.3 males. For every 100 females age 18 and over, there were 90.8 males.

The median income for a household in the town was $36,397, and the median income for a family was $44,167. Males had a median income of $27,917 versus $21,679 for females. The per capita income for the town was $14,506. About 4.3% of families and 5.2% of the population were below the poverty line, including 5.8% of those under age 18 and 10.5% of those age 65 or over.

Notable people
Edward W. Pearson Sr., African-American businessman and residential developer in Asheville, North Carolina
Daniel R. Simpson, American jurist and legislator

References

Towns in Burke County, North Carolina
North Carolina populated places on the Catawba River